Elliot Morgan Thorpe (born 9 November 2000) is a professional footballer who plays for Luton Town, as a midfielder. Born in England, he represents Wales at youth international level.

Club career
Born in Hinchingbrooke, Thorpe began his career with Cambridge United and Tottenham Hotspur.

He signed for Luton Town in September 2021. He initially played for Luton's development squad. He made his first-team debut on 5 February 2022, in the FA Cup.

On 1 September 2022 he moved on loan to Burton Albion. Thorpe was recalled by Luton in January 2023.

International career
Thorpe qualifies for Wales through his mother. He has represented Wales at youth levels, starting at under-16 team, and including the under-21 team.

Extenal links

References

2000 births
Living people
People from Huntingdonshire
English footballers
Welsh footballers
Cambridge United F.C. players
Tottenham Hotspur F.C. players
Luton Town F.C. players
Burton Albion F.C. players
Association football midfielders
Wales youth international footballers
Wales under-21 international footballers
English people of Welsh descent
English Football League players